Are is a historical surname from the Western Regions (Xiyu) as described in Chinese history.  The Biographies of the Huigu from the Old Book of Tang stated:

There are some families with this surname in the state of Andhra Pradesh located in south east region of India.

See also
 Aje clan

Chinese-language surnames
Individual Chinese surnames